The 2004 Siebel Open was a men's tennis tournament played on indoor hard courts at the HP Pavilion at San Jose in San Jose, California in the United States that was part of the International Series of the 2004 ATP Tour. The tournament ran from February 9 through February 15, 2004. First-seeded Andy Roddick won the singles title.

Finals

Singles

 Andy Roddick defeated  Mardy Fish 7–6(15–13), 6–4
 It was Roddick's 1st title of the year and the 14th of his career.

Doubles

 James Blake /  Mardy Fish defeated  Rick Leach /  Brian MacPhie 6–2, 7–5
 It was Blake's 1st title of the year and the 4th of his career. It was Fish's 1st title of the year and the 3rd of his career.

References

Siebel Open
SAP Open
Siebel Open
Siebel Open
Siebel Open